This is a list of television shows produced or distributed by Legendary Television, a division of Legendary Entertainment owned by Wanda Group.

Filmography

Television series

Television films

Upcoming shows

Passed projects

References

Legendary